TTV World was a television channel operated by Taiwan Television (TTV) in Taiwan, launched on 22 July 2005, but was only broadcast abroad.

Broadcast platform
North America--Cloud Tech Media
Australia-----FetchTV (Australia)
Malaysia------ABNXcess
Singapore----Singtel TV

External links
 TTV World official blog

Television stations in Taiwan
Television channels and stations established in 2005
Chinese-language television stations
Mass media in Taipei
Taiwan Television
Television channels and stations disestablished in 2016